
<onlyinclude> The following is a list of Sites of Special Scientific Interest (SSSIs) in Wiltshire, England, United Kingdom. In England the body responsible for designating SSSIs is Natural England, which chooses a site because of its fauna, flora, geological or physiographical features. As of 2006, there are 134 sites designated in this Area of Search, of which the vast majority, 108, have been designated due to their biological interest, with just 21 due to their geological interest (and 5 for both).

Natural England took over the role of designating and managing SSSIs from English Nature in October 2006 when it was formed from the amalgamation of English Nature, parts of the Countryside Agency and the Rural Development Service. Natural England, like its predecessor, uses the 1974–1996 county system and as such the same approach is followed here, rather than adopting the current local government or ceremonial county boundaries. The data in the table is taken from English Nature's website in the form of citation sheets for each SSSI.

For other counties, see List of SSSIs by Area of Search.

Sites

Notes 
Data rounded to one decimal place.
Grid reference is based on the British national grid reference system, also known as OSGB36, and is the system used by the Ordnance Survey.
Link to maps using the MAGIC map service provided by Defra.

References 

 
Wiltshire
Sites of Special